The Red Hills of Dundee is a mountain range in Yamhill County, Oregon.

References 

Mountain ranges of Oregon
Landforms of Yamhill County, Oregon